There are 114 colleges and universities in the Commonwealth of Massachusetts that are listed under the Carnegie Classification of Institutions of Higher Education. These institutions include fourteen research universities, twenty-one master's universities, and thirty-four special-focus institutions. Eighty-five of Massachusetts' post-secondary institutions are private, of which five are for-profit. Thirty of the state's post-secondary institutions are public, a number which excludes the Massachusetts Institute of Technology, which was founded by the Morrill Land-Grant Acts, but later became a private institution.

Harvard University is the state's oldest post-secondary institution, having been founded in 1636. Boston University is the state's largest institution of higher learning in terms of enrollment, having 32,603 students in the fall of 2013 while Conway School of Landscape Design is the state's smallest college with an enrollment of 18. The University of Massachusetts Amherst is the state's largest public university, with an enrollment of 28,518 students. Massachusetts is also home to a number of internationally recognized universities, including Harvard and the Massachusetts Institute of Technology, which are ranked among the top ten universities in the world.

The University of Massachusetts Amherst is the state's sole public land-grant university, and is the flagship institution of the University of Massachusetts system. There are also eleven Catholic post-secondary institutions, including Boston College, College of the Holy Cross, and Stonehill College. There are also two Judaic post-secondary institutions in Massachusetts, including Brandeis University and Hebrew College. The state has four medical schools, Boston University School of Medicine, Harvard Medical School, the University of Massachusetts Medical School, and Tufts University School of Medicine. There are nine law schools, which are accredited by the American Bar Association, including Boston College Law School, Harvard Law School and the University of Massachusetts School of Law. One hundred and seven of Massachusetts post-secondary institutions are officially recognized by the New England Association of Schools and Colleges (NEASC), while most are accredited by multiple higher education accreditation agencies.

Extant institutions

Defunct institutions

At least eighty-two colleges and universities have closed in Massachusetts, beginning with Worcester Medical Institute in 1859. Defunct institutes include multiple private institutions, and the public Hyannis State Teachers College. Many schools were also merged into modern public universities, which form the origins of the Boston, Dartmouth, and Lowell campuses of the University of Massachusetts system. Many of these were private institutions, which either merged with private institutions and ceased to grant degrees, or institutions like the Swedenborg School of Religion, which merged with the Pacific School of Religion upon its relocation to California. The Bible Normal School was founded in Massachusetts but moved to Connecticut before it was merged into the Hartford Seminary. However, this excludes institutions which operated as part of for-profit corporations incorporated in other states, such as Empire Beauty Schools and the University of Phoenix, as they were not operated as separate college campuses and operated more as corporate entities.

Forbes National Rankings

The Forbes National Colleges Ranking is a ranking system for the best four-year colleges in the United States. These colleges are ranked for their alumni salary, debt, return on investment, graduation rate, membership in Forbes honors lists such as Forbes 30 Under 30, student retention, and academic achievement. As of 2021, Forbes recognizes the University of Massachusetts Amherst as the flagship public university and Massachusetts Institute of Technology as the flagship private university in Massachusetts.

See also

 List of college athletic programs in Massachusetts
 List of engineering schools in Massachusetts
 List of law schools in Massachusetts
 List of colleges and universities in metropolitan Boston
 Colleges of Worcester Consortium
 Higher education in the United States
 Lists of American institutions of higher education
 List of recognized higher education accreditation organizations

Notes

References

External links
List of public institutions of higher learning in Massachusetts
List of all colleges and universities in Massachusetts

 
Colleges and Universities
Massachusetts